Maria Elizabeth Buehler de Lutz (December 10, 1921 – July 6, 2012) was an American film actress.

Buehler was from Gloversville, New York, the daughter of Gustave Buehler, a baker and German immigrant. She attended Fort Plain High School, Fort Plain, New York, and graduated from Columbia University with a BA degree.

Buehler's professional stage debut came with the Washington Square Players in Hamlet.

Her work on television led to her having a film contract. Max Arnow, a talent scout for Columbia, saw her on TV and arranged a screen test, after which she had a long-term contract with Columbia. She made her film debut in the noir crime thriller The Mob (1951) alongside Broderick Crawford. She had an uncredited part in the 1953 film Taxi and then disappeared from the film industry.

Filmography
 The Mob (1951)
 Taxi (1953)

References

External links
 

American film actresses
20th-century American actresses
People from Gloversville, New York
1921 births
2012 deaths
American stage actresses
American television actresses
Columbia University alumni
21st-century American women